Casa View is a residential neighborhood in Dallas, Texas, United States, located near White Rock Lake in the northeastern portion of the city. According to the Greater Casa View Alliance, the Greater Casa View area is bordered by Buckner Boulevard, Garland Road, I-635 and Oates to the city line of neighboring Mesquite. The area has traditionally been nearly synonymous with the adjoining Casa Linda neighborhood but is gaining momentum in its own right and was named by D Magazine as one of "5 Neighborhoods on the Rise" in its July 2016 issue.

In the 1960s Casa View was mostly White and Protestant and Roman Catholic. By the early 2010s it became mostly Hispanic. Today, Casa View is a diverse and progressive neighborhood with a high concentration of single-family homes, including one of the city's largest enclaves of mid-century modern homes designed by famed architect Cliff May.

Shopping
The hub of shopping activity in the area, particularly in the 1960s and 1970s, was Casa View Shopping Center. Sears opened a store in there at Gus Thomasson Road and Ferguson roads in 1956. J.C. Penney was another anchor tenant.

It is also remembered as the home to a dance studio where Texie Waterman (November 25, 1931 - October 14, 1996) selected and coached the Dallas Cowboy Cheerleaders. The squad made its inaugural appearance in the 1972-73 football season. She was the instructor through 1983.

Another long-term tenant in the shopping center is Charles Blaylock Realtors. Blaylock was a Dallas firefighter who opened the agency in 1956. According to The Dallas Morning News as of 2006, he is "still at it and uses the moniker 'King of Casa View.'"

Education
Dallas Independent School District operates area public schools. Zoned schools include:
 Casa View Elementary School
 Charles A. Gill Elementary School
 George W. Truett Elementary School
 Reinhardt Elementary School
 Edwin J. Kiest Elementary School
 W.H. Gaston Middle School
 Robert T. Hill Middle School
 Bryan Adams High School

Dallas Public Library operates the Lochwood Library. Previously it operated the Casa View Branch, opened on February 29, 1964.
 The branch was closed in 2008 to be replaced with the Lochwood Library at the intersection of Jupiter and Garland roads.

References

Neighborhoods in East Dallas